Arrelious Markus Benn (born September 8, 1988) is a former American football wide receiver. He was drafted by the Tampa Bay Buccaneers in the second round of the 2010 NFL Draft. He played college football for the University of Illinois Fighting Illini.

High school career
A native of Washington, DC, Benn attended Dunbar High School in the Truxton Circle neighborhood, where he was teammates with Vontae Davis and Nate Bussey. Benn played wide receiver, running back, safety, and linebacker in high school, and was named a First-team High School All-American his senior season.  That year, Benn caught 56 passes for 1,039 yards and nine touchdowns, the first Dunbar player to ever crack the 1,000 yard mark.  During his junior season in high school, Benn caught 50 passes for 1,147 yards and 17 touchdowns.  Following his high school career, Benn was invited to play in the 2007 U.S. Army All-American Bowl.

Regarded as a five-star recruit by Rivals.com, Benn was ranked as the No. 5 wide receiver prospect in the class of 2007, behind Ronald Johnson, Terrence Toliver, Chris Culliver, and Dwight Jones. Benn chose Illinois over Maryland, Notre Dame, Miami (FL), and Florida State.

College career
During his freshman season, Benn caught 43 passes for 521 yards (54 passes for 676 yards including the Rose Bowl appearance by Illinois that season); this was the team high for the season and a school record for a freshman. Benn also added 158 yards on 32 carries on the ground, along with returning 10 kickoffs for 280 yards, including a 90-yard kickoff return for touchdown against Penn State, one of his two touchdowns that day.  He was named the 2007 Big Ten Freshman of the Year.

During his sophomore campaign, Benn's stats improved to 67 rec and a Big Ten-leading 1055 yards, along with 3 touchdowns through the air, and also contributed to the run game with 101 yards on 23 carries, with 2 rushing touchdowns. On August 10, 2009 Benn was named to the Walter Camp "Players to Watch" list for its prestigious Player of the Year award, the nation's fourth-oldest individual college football accolade. On August 12, 2009 Benn was named to 2009 Biletnikoff Trophy Watch list.

As a junior, Benn suffered a right ankle sprain in the season opener against Missouri, and played injured the rest of the season, appearing in all 12 games, but accumulating only 38 receptions for 490 yards and two touchdowns through the air, to go with 7 carries for 23 yards and one touchdown on the ground.

On December 16, 2009, following his junior season, Arrelious Benn announced his decision to enter the 2010 NFL Draft.

College awards and honors
 Maxwell Award Candidate
 Bliletnikoff Award Candidate
 Preseason Third-team All-American (by Athlon)
 Preseason First-team All-Big Ten (by Athlon)
 Preseason First-team All-Big Ten wide receiver and kick returner (by Blue Ribbon)
 Preseason First-team All-Big Ten (by Lindy's)
 Preseason First-team All-Big Ten (by The Sporting News)
 Named Big Ten's Fastest Receiver (by The Sporting News)
 Rated the No. 20 player in the nation (by The Sporting News)
 Rated the No. 19 wide receiver in the nation (by Lindy's)
 Rated the No. 1 wide receiver in the Big Ten (by The Sporting News)
 2007 Big Ten Freshman of the Year
 2007 Freshman All-American

Professional career

Tampa Bay Buccaneers
Benn was drafted in the second round, pick 39 overall, by the Tampa Bay Buccaneers.

Philadelphia Eagles
On March 15, 2013, Benn was traded to the Philadelphia Eagles, along with a 7th-round pick, for a 2013 6th-round pick and a 2014 conditional pick. On March 21, 2013, Benn signed a one-year contract extension through 2014. On August 6, 2013, Benn tore his ACL. On August 7, 2013, Benn was placed on the Injured Reserve list, which officially ended his 2013 season. He was released by the Eagles on May 16, 2014. Benn was re-signed by Philadelphia on May 19. Benn was placed on injured reserve on August 30, 2014. He was waived with an injury settlement on September 6.

Jacksonville Jaguars
Benn signed with the Jacksonville Jaguars on January 5, 2015. On September 3, 2016, he was released by the Jaguars, but re-signed with the team a day later. The season-opening game marked the first time that Benn had been on an active NFL roster in three years. He scored a 51-yard touchdown in Week 6 against the Chicago Bears after catching a simple slant route, sliding to catch the pass, then getting up and running to the end zone without being touched. This was Benn's first touchdown reception since 2011.

On February 15, 2017, the Jaguars re-signed Benn to a one-year deal with a second year option. He was placed on injured reserve on November 18, 2017 with a knee injury.

On February 20, 2018, the Jaguars declined the option on Benn's contract, making him a free agent.

References

External links
 Illinois profile

1988 births
Living people
American football wide receivers
Illinois Fighting Illini football players
Jacksonville Jaguars players
Philadelphia Eagles players
Tampa Bay Buccaneers players
Players of American football from Washington, D.C.
African-American players of American football
Dunbar High School (Washington, D.C.) alumni
21st-century African-American sportspeople
20th-century African-American people